Stoke Mill was an historic watermill located in Ipswich, Suffolk. It was located on the north bank of the River Orwell next to Stoke Bridge. It was on Bridge Street where there is now a skate park.

References

Mills in Ipswich
Watermills in Suffolk